Hemiancistrus guahiborum is a species of catfish in the family Loricariidae. It is native to South America, where it occurs in the Orinoco drainage in Venezuela. The species reaches at least 12.55 cm (4.9 inches) SL and was described in 2005 by David C. Werneke and Jonathan W. Armbruster of Auburn University, Nathan K. Lujan of the American Museum of Natural History, and Donald C. Taphorn of the Royal Ontario Museum on the basis of its distinctive coloration and morphology. It appears in the aquarium trade, where it is usually known either as the orange-seam pleco or by its L-number, which is L-106.

References 

Ancistrini
Fish described in 2005